The Sweet Pretty Things (Are in Bed Now, of Course...) is the twelfth studio album by the English band Pretty Things. It was released in 2015 via Repertoire Records.

It is the first album by long-time frontmen Phil May and Dick Taylor with their touring bassist George Woosey and drummer Jack Greenwood, and also their first without longtime keyboardist Jon Povey and drummer Skip Alan since 1965's Get the Picture?.

The title is taken from the opening line of Bob Dylan's song "Tombstone Blues".

The track "Turn My Head" was originally written by the band in the mid-1960s. A version was a recorded live at the BBC but an official studio version of the song was not released until this album.

Track listing

Personnel
Pretty Things
Phil May – lead vocals, maracas
Dick Taylor – lead guitar, vocals
Frank Holland – guitars, lead guitar on "And I Do," Mellotron, vocals
George Woosey – bass, guitars, vocals
Jack Greenwood – drums, percussion, vocals
Additional musicians
 Mark St. John – vocals, percussion, engineer
Nick Brockway – Hammond organ

References

2015 albums
Pretty Things albums
Repertoire Records albums